Seligson is a surname. Notable people with the surname include:

Esther Seligson (1941–2010), Mexican writer, poet, translator and historian
Gary Seligson (born 1960), American drummer and percussionist
Julius Seligson (1909–1987), American tennis player 
Mitchell A. Seligson (born 1945), American political scientist and sociologist
Paul Seligson, British-born English teacher